Keep the Circle: B-sides and Udder Stuff is a compilation of b-sides from Oldham-based band Inspiral Carpets, released in February 2007 to coincide with their short tour of the UK.  The album is only available as a digital download from iTunes and other download services.

It contains a previously unheard version of "Saturn 5" with guest vocals by Mark E. Smith of The Fall. Also included is an hour-long interview with the group discussing most of the songs.

Some of these songs were released on Rare As, the second disc of the Cool As collection in 2003.

Track listing
"Garage Full of Flowers" (Debris flexi version) – 3:46
"Commercial Reign" – 4:40
"Directing Traffic" – 2:37
"So Far" – 2:12
"Planecrash" – 16:37
"Out of Time" – 2:22
"Move In" – 5:49
"Tune for a Family" – 2:55
"Seeds of Doubt" – 1:54
"Goldtop" (Who's Sane Mix) – 3:38
"Goldtop" – 6:30
"I'll Keep It In Mind" – 3:18
"Skidoo" – 7:01
"St. Kilda" – 4:10
"The Wind is Calling Your Name" – 4:31
"St. Kilda" (Instrumental) – 4:08
"I Know I'm Losing You" – 6:34
"Boomerang" – 5:28
"Lost in Space Again" – 5:26
"It's Only a Paper Moon" – 5:52
"I'm Alive" – 4:58
"Saturn 5" (featuring Mark E. Smith) – 3:59
"Well of Seven Heads" – 4:41
"Two Cows" – 1:52
"Going Down" – 3:24
"We Can Do Everything" – 3:23
"Inside of You" – 3:32
"Cobra" (Satanic Wurlie mix) – 2:45
"Uniform" (Scripka Mix) featuring strings by the Balanescu Quartet – 3:50
"Probably the First Digital Spine Message in the World Ever" – 54:26 (interview track – title refers to the group's habit of putting brief messages on the spines of their record sleeves)

References

Inspiral Carpets albums
2007 compilation albums
B-side compilation albums
Mute Records compilation albums